Mullikin is a surname. Notable people with the surname include:

Anna Mullikin (1893–1975), American mathematician
Mary Augusta Mullikin (1874–1964), American painter

See also
Mulliken (disambiguation)
Millikin (disambiguation)